= Tuscany Now & More =

Villa rental & vacation company

Tuscany Now & More Ltd
- Type: Private
- Industry: Travel · Hospitality
- Founded: 10 April 1990
- Founder: Simon Ball · Barbara Boni‑Ball
- Headquarters: London, United Kingdom
- Area served: International
- Number of employees: 35(incl. freelancers & contractors)
- Subsidiaries: Tuscany Now & More SL (Spain)
- Website: https://www.tuscanynowandmore.com

Tuscany Now & More Ltd is a London‑based, family‑run villa rental and travel‑planning company specialising in Italian villa holidays.

== History ==
Tuscany Now was founded on 10 April 1990 in London by Simon Ball and Barbara Boni‑Ball, initially offering a single villa, Vaggio Savernano, near Florence. The company subsequently expanded its portfolio to include a range of villas and apartments throughout Italy.

In 2008, in response to rising competition from online platforms such as Airbnb and TripAdvisor, the company repositioned itself exclusively towards high‑end private villas, phasing out apartments and establishing itself as a boutique luxury provider.

On 3 May 2013, the company was formally incorporated as Tuscany Now & More Ltd, enabling an expansion beyond accommodation into curated travel services and experiences.

In 2023 and 2024, Travel + Leisure's World's Best Awards named Tuscany Now & More the Winner of Best Luxury Villa Rental Company and in 2025 awarded it 2nd place in the same category.

== Operations ==
Tuscany Now & More specialises in a curated collection of over 130 luxury villas across Tuscany, Umbria, Veneto and, since 2025, Piedmont. The company works with villa owners to renovate properties, combining historic features with modern comforts.
